Kʼicheʼ, Kʼicheʼe', or Quiché may refer to:
Kʼicheʼ people of Guatemala, a subgroup of the Maya 
Kʼicheʼ language, a Maya language spoken by the Kʼicheʼ people
Classical Kʼicheʼ language, the 16th century form of the Kʼicheʼ language
Kʼicheʼ Kingdom of Qʼumarkaj, a pre-Columbian state in the Guatemalan highlands

See also
Quiche (disambiguation)